The banded pig (Sus scrofa vittatus) also known as the Indonesian wild boar is a subspecies of wild boar native to the Thai-Malay Peninsula and many Indonesian islands, including Sumatra, Java, and the Lesser Sundas as far east as Komodo. It is known as the wild boar in Singapore. It is the most basal subspecies, having the smallest relative brain size, more primitive dentition, and unspecialised cranial structure. It is a short-faced subspecies with a white band on the muzzle, as well as sparse body hair, no underwool, a fairly long mane, and a broad reddish band extending from the muzzle to the sides of the neck. It is much smaller than the mainland S. s. cristatus subspecies, with the largest specimens on Komodo weighing only 48 kg.

In some areas, it differs from most other boar populations by being highly frugivorous, with specimens in Ujung Kulon National Park in Java eating around 50 different fruit species, especially figs, thus making them important seed dispersers. On the islands of Komodo and Rinca, its diet is more varied, encompassing roots, tubers, grasses, insects, fruits, snakes, and carrion. It also frequently eats crabs during low tide. Piglets are born from December to March in litters of two to six, and are raised in grass nests constructed by their mother. They are much less vividly striped than the young of S. s. scrofa.

On the islands of Komodo, Rinca, and Flores, the banded pig is a primary food source for Komodo dragons.

References

Mammals described in 1828
Suidae
Wild boars
Mammals of Indonesia